Yamagola ( Havoc in Hell or  The Great Havoc) is a 1977 Indian Telugu-language fantasy comedy film directed by T. Rama Rao who co-wrote the film with D. V. Narasa Raju. It stars N. T. Rama Rao and Jaya Prada, with music composed by Chakravarthy. The film was produced by S. Venkataratnam who also worked as the cinematographer.

Yamagola released on 21 October 1977 and received positive reviews. The dialogues penned by D. V. Narasaraju were perceived as a satire on contemporary politics, especially the Emergency and are considered as one of the highlights of the film along with the performances of the cast and the music. It was remade in Hindi as Lok Parlok (1979) and in Tamil as Yamanukku Yaman (1980), while also inspiring the 2007 Telugu film Yamadonga.

Plot 
The film begins in a village where its President Satyam makes the area prosperous and confronts the barbarities of a tyrant Rudrayya. Satyam falls for a charming girl Savitri daughter of Rudrayya. Knowing it, Rudrayya intrigues and murders Satyam utilising a professional killer Ram Sastry in the traditional form. After that, Ram Sastry asks Rudrayya to wait until he completes demonic prayers. But as it's getting late Rudrayya buries the body in the backyard.

Now the soldiers of hell temporally send Satyam to heaven where he creates turmoil and turbulence and encounters Indra. Afterward, he is moved to hell where too, he gives rise to a mayhem situation by starting a union of hell soldiers and making their revolt. Satyam opposes Yama Dharma Raja and Chitragupta which calms down through negotiations when Yama realises to reform their laws. Hence, he lands on earth with Chitragupta in human form and declares lock-out. Eventually, Satyam also restores his life with a promise to return until their arrival.

By that time, Police are in search of Satyam and suspect Rudrayya. Consequently, Satyam approaches panic-stricken Rudrayya as his resemblance. As an unbeknownst Rudrayya appoints and forges him as Satyam whereby, and he starts mocking him. Parallelly, Yama and Chitragupta on Earth face several challenges and are ultimately seized by Police when Satyam acquits them. Being exhausted they decide to go back which frightens Satyam as he should also die. So, he plans with Savitri and invites them to Rudrayya's house. Accordingly, Savitri serves them with adoration and asks a boon to perform her espousal with her beau which he accepts.

During the time of the wedding, Satyam is under the veil and Yama blesses the long life of the couple, therefore, Satyam escapes from death. Suddenly, Rudrayya fires on Satyam. Here as a flabbergast, Satyam wakes up and it is revealed to be his dream. Immediately Rudrayya re-attacks but Satyam ceases him. At last, it is affirmed that Ram Sastry is Satyam's friend Ramana Murthy and all is his play when Rudrayya pleads for pardon. Finally, the movie ends on a happy note with the marriage of Satyam and Savitri.

Cast 
N. T. Rama Rao as Satyam
Jaya Prada as Savithri
Rao Gopal Rao as Rudrayya
Kaikala Satyanarayana as Yama Dharma Raju
Allu Ramalingaiah as Chitraguptudu
Prabhakar Reddy as Ramana Murthy/Rama Sastry
Kanta Rao as Indra
P. J. Sarma as Police Inspector
Chalapathi Rao as Satyam's friend
K. V. Chalam as Peerayya
Potti Prasad as Dentist
Suryakantham as Seethamma
Manju Bhargavi as Menaka
Jhansi as Wife of Rudrayya
Jayamalini in an item number
Nirmalamma as Santhamma

Production 
The film was inspired by Rama Rao's own Devanthakudu (1960), and two other films  Death Takes a Holiday (1934) and Chase a Crooked Shadow (1958). Devanthakudu, in turn was a remake of the 1958 Bengali film Jamalaye Jibanta Manush based on the novel of the same name by Dinabandhu Mitra. Principal photography began on 28 May 1977, and was completed in 27 working days.

Soundtrack 
Music was composed by Chakravarthy.

Release 
Yamagola was released on 21 October 1977. The film celebrated a silver jubilee run at 6 centres and ran for 40 weeks in Hyderabad and Vijayawada.

Reception 
A reviewer for Andhra Jyothi praised D. V. Narasaraju's dialogues, performances of the cast and called it, "a colourful film which would entertain all kinds of audiences." Another reviewer for Andhra Patrika wrote, "Yamagola is a satirical film on the current societal conditions told in a light-hearted manner." The reviewer noted the satirical dialogues of Narasaraju as the major highlight of the film and commended the performances of the cast and the music. Kompella Viswam of Sitara magazine noted the similarities between Yamagola and C. Pullayya's Devanthakudu. Furthermore, he praised the dialogues penned by D. V. Narasaraju especially those on Sanjay Gandhi and the Emergency, the performances of the cast and the direction of T. Rama Rao.

Legacy 
The film was remade into Hindi as Lok Parlok in 1979, with Jaya Prada reprising her role. It was also remade in Tamil as Yamanukku Yaman (1980).

Yamagola also inspired the 2007 Telugu film Yamadonga directed by S. S. Rajamouli. The film which follows the basic plotline of Yamagola starred Rama Rao's grandson N. T. Rama Rao Jr.

References

External links 
 

1970s fantasy comedy films
1970s Telugu-language films
1977 comedy films
1977 films
Films directed by T. Rama Rao
Films scored by K. Chakravarthy
Indian fantasy comedy films
Indian religious comedy films
Telugu films remade in other languages
Yama in popular culture